Lago del Mucrone is a lake in the Province of Biella, Piedmont, Italy. At an elevation of 1894 m, its surface area is 0.01713 km².

Lakes of Piedmont
Province of Biella
Biellese Alps